Daniel Haugh (born May 3, 1995) is an American track and field athlete competing in the hammer throw. He competed in the men's hammer throw event at the 2020 Summer Olympics held in Tokyo, Japan.

He won the gold medal in the men's hammer throw event at the 2019 NCAA Division I Outdoor Track and Field Championships. In 2019, he also represented the United States in The Match Europe v USA where he finished in 5th place in the men's hammer throw event.

In that same year, he competed in the men's hammer throw at the 2019 World Athletics Championships held in Doha, Qatar. He did not qualify to compete in the final.

References

External links 
 
 
 
 
 

Living people
1995 births
Male weight throwers
American male hammer throwers
World Athletics Championships athletes for the United States
Alabama Crimson Tide men's track and field athletes
Kennesaw State Owls athletes
Athletes (track and field) at the 2020 Summer Olympics
Olympic track and field athletes of the United States
20th-century American people
21st-century American people